Athrips tetrapunctella is a moth of the family Gelechiidae. It is found in France, Great Britain, Ireland, Fennoscandia, Denmark, Estonia, Latvia, Russia and Ukraine. In the east, the range extends through the southern Ural and Siberia to Primorsky Krai.

The wingspan is 9–10 mm. The forewings are yellow, with the costal margin and apical areas black. The posterior margin covered with dark scales and there is a prominent dark spot near the base, two others at one-third and two-thirds and an additional small black spot at one-fourth near the costa, as well as another at two-thirds near the posterior margin. The hindwings are grey.

The larvae feed on Lathyrus palustris and Medicago sativa. They live within a spun or rolled leaf. The species overwinters in the pupal stage.

References

Moths described in 1794
Athrips
Moths of Europe
Moths of Asia